Stanstead St Margarets, often abbreviated to just St Margarets, is a village and civil parish in the district of East Hertfordshire, Hertfordshire, England. It is located halfway between the towns of Hoddesdon and Ware. The village is separated from the village of Stanstead Abbotts by the River Lea, and had a population of 1,318 at the census of 2001, increasing to 1,652 at the 2011 Census.

Geography
The Greenwich Meridian (longitude 0°) passes through the village with its exact position marked by Meridian obelisks which were erected in 1984 to commemorate the centenary of the adoption of the prime meridian line. The current line is one of many that have existed, however the Global Positioning Satellite (GPS) system uses a prime meridian that is about 100 metres east of the Greenwich Meridian at Stanstead Abbotts.

Transport
The village is served by St Margarets station on the Hertford East Line, operated by Abellio Greater Anglia. St Margarets station was formerly the junction with the now closed Buntingford Branch Line.

Sport and leisure
The St. Margaretsbury recreation ground hosts both a football club, St. Margaretsbury F.C., and includes both youth and adult football teams, as well as a cricket club.

The village has a Scout Group, the 1st Stanstead Abbotts & St. Margaret's Scout Group.

See also
Stanstead Abbotts
Stanstead Lock, River Lea

References

Villages in Hertfordshire
Civil parishes in Hertfordshire
East Hertfordshire District